"You Played Yourself" is a song performed by American recording artist Ice-T. It was released on April 5, 1990, as a single from the rapper's third studio album The Iceberg/Freedom of Speech...Just Watch What You Say through Sire Records. The song was written and produced by Ice-T and Afrika Islam, who sampled James Brown's "The Boss", which was written by James Brown, Charles Bobbit and Fred Wesley. The single peaked at number 64 in the UK.

Background
The song tells details several failures through hubris. One goes uneducated thinking he is a gangster when really he is nothing. Another is a rapper who offends his fans because he thinks he is above them but they turn on him - he is left unemployed with no one because he has offended them all. Another is a drug addict, paranoid and doesn't eat. He rips off his family for drug money and they disown him. He then tries to do an armed robbery to get money but accidentally kills someone and ends up on death row.

Track listing

Personnel
 Tracy Lauren Marrow – lyrics, vocals, producer, arranging
 Eric Reed Boucher – guest vocals on "Freedom Of Speech"
 Eric Garcia – scratches
 Charles Andre Glenn – producer, programming
 Alphonso Henderson – additional producer (re-mixing)
 Roger McBride – additional producer (re-mixing)
 Tom Baker – mastering
 Glen E. Friedman – photography
 Frank Mike Jones – photography

Chart positions

References

External links

Ice-T songs
1989 songs
1990 singles
Gangsta rap songs
Sire Records singles
Songs written by Ice-T
Songs written by Afrika Islam
Songs written by Fred Wesley
Songs written by James Brown